Jo Ann Beard is an American essayist.

Life
Beard was born in 1955, Moline, Illinois. She graduated from the University of Iowa with a BFA in art, and from The Nonfiction Writing Program with an MFA in creative nonfiction. She teaches at Sarah Lawrence College.

Beard previously worked as a managing editor for a physics journal at the University of Iowa, and was a colleague of the victims of the University of Iowa shooting, which became a subject for her work.

Her writing has appeared in literary journals and magazines.

Awards
 1997 Whiting Award
 2005 Guggenheim Fellow

Works

Essays
"The Fourth State of Matter", The New Yorker, June 24, 1996
"Undertaker, Please Drive Slow," Tin House, Issue #12, Summer 2002
"Maybe It Happened", O, The Oprah Magazine, August 2008
"The Longest Night: Saying Goodbye to My Beloved Pet", O, The Oprah Magazine, June 2009

Books

Anthologies

References

External links
"Meet a rare creature: the wholly talented, wholly modest Jo Ann Beard", Book Page, February 1998
"A Conversation with Jo Ann Beard", nidus, No. 3 Fall 2002.
"Jo Ann Beard Interviewed by Michael Gardner", Mary Literary Journal
Profile at The Whiting Foundation
https://www.nytimes.com/2021/03/11/books/review/jo-ann-beard-by-the-book-interview.html

American essayists
University of Iowa alumni
Sarah Lawrence College faculty
Living people
1955 births
O. Henry Award winners